Ham Seok-min is a footballer who plays for Gangwon FC on loan from Suwon Bluewings. In 2013, he was called onto the South Korea national under-20 football team.

Finishing high school, he went to Soongsil University where he won the Ggoalkeeper award in 2013. Afterwards, he would head to the Korea National League.
An ardent supporter of Suwon Samsung Bluewings since 2005, he revealed that 'Suwon was always the No.1 club in his mind' after joining them.

Trophies
Ham has received 1x K League Classic Runners-Up medal.

References

External links 
 

1994 births
Living people
South Korean footballers
Gangwon FC players
Suwon Samsung Bluewings players
K League 1 players
Korea National League players
Association football goalkeepers